is a town located in on the southwest coast of Izu Peninsula in Kamo District, Shizuoka Prefecture, Japan. ,  the town had an estimated population of 6,563 in 2969 households, and a population density of 77 persons per km². Sakuramochi is a noted local specialty. Matsuzaki is listed as one of The Most Beautiful Villages in Japan.

Geography
Matsuzaki is located on the southwest coast of Izu Peninsula, facing Suruga Bay on the Pacific Ocean. It is a hilly region with an indented ria coastline. The area has numerous hot springs. Warmed by the warm Kuroshio Current, the area enjoys a warm maritime climate with hot, humid summers and mild, cool winters. Parts of the town are within the borders of Fuji-Hakone-Izu National Park.

Neighboring municipalities
Shizuoka Prefecture
Shimoda
Minamiizu
Kawazu
Nishiizu

Demographics
Per Japanese census data, the population of Matsuzaki has been in slow decline over the past 50 years.

Climate
The city has a climate characterized by hot and humid summers, and relatively mild winters (Köppen climate classification Cfa).

History
During the Edo period, all of Izu Province was tenryō territory under direct control of the Tokugawa shogunate, and the area now comprising Matsuzaki Town consisted of 21 villages. With the establishment of the modern municipalities system of the early Meiji period in 1889, the area was divided into 11 villages within Kamo District, and 10 villages within Naka District. After the abolishment of Naka District, all 21 villages were reunited under Kamo District. Matsuzaki Village was elevated to town status in 1901. The town annexed neighboring Nakagawa Village in 1955 and Iwashina Village in 1956.

Around March 31, 2010, the city of Shimoda and three municipalities in Kamo District (Kawazu, Matsuzaki, and Minamiizu) were scheduled to merge. However, the merger backed out.

Economy
The economy of Matsuzaki is dominated by commercial fishing, forestry and the tourist industry centered on hot spring resorts. Some 64% of the area is forest.

Education
Matsuzaki has one public elementary school and one public junior high school operated by the town government. The town has one public high school operated by the Shizuoka Prefectural Board of Education.

Transportation

Highway

Notable people from Matsuzaki
Irie Chōhachi - artist
Kondō Heisaburō - pharmacologist
Yoda Benzō - Hokkaido pioneer
Rentarō Mikuni - actor

Gallery

References

External links

Matsuzaki official website (Japanese)

 
Towns in Shizuoka Prefecture
Populated coastal places in Japan